Just Between Friends: Original Motion Picture Soundtrack is the original soundtrack to the film Just Between Friends. Released in 1986, the film score was composed by Patrick Williams and performed by Earl Klugh.

Track listing 
"Heat" - 4:10
"Strolling" - 2:21
"Secrets" - 3:17
"Bad News" - 3:02
"Foreplay" - 2:18
"Galleria" - 2:46
"Just Between Friends" - 3:58
"Missing You" - 2:39
"Like at First Sight" - 3:00
"Life Goes On" - 3:14
"Going Home" - 2:11
"Tennis Anyone" - 3:21
"Reconciliation" - 3:!5
"Just Between Friends (Just Earl)" - 0:48

Personnel 
Composer & Producer: Patrick Williams
Guitar: Earl Klugh
Keyboards: Don Grusin
Drums: Harvey Mason
Bass: Neil Stubenhaus
Percussion: Paulinho Da Costa
Guitar: Carlos Rios
Guitar: Timothy Ray
Keyboards: Randy Kerber
Piano: Ralph Greeson
Synthesizer Programming: Jay Gruska
Percussion: Steve Foreman
Concert Master: Paul Shure
Engineer, Mixing: Don Hahn

References 

1986 soundtrack albums
Earl Klugh albums
Film scores
Warner Records soundtracks